Pseudepimolis rhyssa is a moth in the family Erebidae first described by Herbert Druce in 1906. It is found in Peru.

References

Phaegopterina
Moths described in 1906